Lorenzo Pani (born 4 July 2002) is an Italian rugby union player, currently playing for Italian United Rugby Championship side Zebre Parma. His preferred position is fullback. 

Pani signed for Benetton in July 2021 ahead of the 2021–22 United Rugby Championship. He made his debut in Round 2 of the 2021–22 EPCR Challenge Cup against .
He played with Benetton until April 2022.

In 2021 and 2022, Pani was named in Italy U20s squad for annual Six Nations Under 20s Championship.

References

External links
itsrugby.co.uk Profile

2002 births
Living people
Italian rugby union players
Benetton Rugby players
Rugby union fullbacks
Zebre Parma players
Sportspeople from Florence